Pirimiphos-methyl, marketed as Actellic, and Sybol is a phosphorothioate used as an insecticide.   It was originally developed by Imperial Chemical Industries Ltd., now Syngenta, at their Jealott's Hill site and first marketed in 1977, ten years after its discovery.

This is one of several compounds used for vector control of Triatoma. These insects are implicated in the transmission of Chagas disease in the Americas. Pirimiphos-methyl can be applied as an interior surface paint additive, in order to achieve a residual pesticide effect.

Pyrimiphos-ethyl is a related insecticide in which the methoxy groups are replaced with ethoxy groups.

References

External links 
 

Acetylcholinesterase inhibitors
Organothiophosphate esters
Pesticides
Aminopyrimidines
Diethylamino compounds
Methoxy compounds